Burbank may refer to:

Places

Australia 
 Burbank, Queensland, a suburb in Brisbane

United States 
 Burbank, California, a city in Los Angeles County
 Burbank, Santa Clara County, California, a census-designated place
 Burbank, Illinois, a city
 Burbank Township, Kandiyohi County, Minnesota
 Burbank, Missouri, an unincorporated community
 Burbank, Ohio, a village
 Burbank, Oklahoma, a town
 Burbank, South Dakota, an unincorporated community
 Burbank, Utah, an unincorporated community
 Burbank Hills, Utah, a small mountain range
 Burbank, Washington, a census-designated place

Schools
 Burbank High School (disambiguation)
 Luther Burbank Middle School (disambiguation)
 Burbank Elementary School (disambiguation)

People and fictional characters
 Burbank (surname)

Other 
 Russet Burbank potato, named after Luther Burbank
 Burbank station (DART), a light rail station in Dallas, Texas